James McMillan Shafter (May 27, 1816 – August 29, 1892) was an American politician who served in Vermont, Wisconsin, and California, and owned large ranches in Marin County, California.

Biography
Born in Athens, Vermont, Shafter graduated from Wesleyan University and Yale Law School, and was admitted to the Vermont bar. In 1841, he served in the Vermont House of Representatives and from 1842 to 1849, Shafter was the Secretary of State of Vermont. In 1850, he moved to Sheboygan, Wisconsin and was elected to the Wisconsin State Assembly. In 1852, Shafter served as speaker of the Assembly. In 1855, he then moved to San Francisco, California, where he practiced law with his brother, Oscar L. Shafter.

In 1857, a complex real estate litigation resulted in the Shafter firm winning a victory for their client of 75,000 acres of farm land at Point Reyes in Marin County. The client sold the property to the Shafters. They leased it to dairy farmers who provided milk and butter to an ever-growing San Francisco and prospered. The Shafter families owned most of Point Reyes from 1857 to 1919, when the land was sold in parcels.

In 1862, Shafter served in the California State Senate and was its President Pro Tempore. Shafter also served in the California Constitution Convention of 1878 and was on the University of California Board of Regents ex officio as President of the California State Agricultural Association.

In March 1888, Shafter survived a gunshot at close range. His son, Dr. James Shafter, had sued for a divorce and the wife's brother, angry at the proceedings, confronted the elder Shafter in the San Francisco City Hall. The brother fired four times at point blank range but missed his mark.

In 1889, Governor Robert Waterman appointed Shafter as judge of the San Francisco County Superior Court to fill the vacancy from the resignation of Jeremiah F. Sullivan.

Civic activities
In November 1885, he was appointed one of the original trustees of Leland Stanford Junior University.

Personal life
In 1845, he married Julia Granville Hubbard (September 11, 1821 – February 11, 1871) in Montpelier, Vermont, who had studied at Troy Female Seminary. They had at least four children: Payne Jewett Shafter, James Chester Shafter, Chester Hubbard Shafter, and Julia Ruth Shafter. His nephew was William Rufus Shafter, who was a general in the American Civil War and recipient of the Medal of Honor.

Notes

1816 births
1892 deaths
People from Athens, Vermont
Secretaries of State of Vermont
Members of the Vermont House of Representatives
Members of the Wisconsin State Assembly
California state senators
California state court judges
Superior court judges in the United States
Politicians from Sheboygan, Wisconsin
Politicians from San Francisco
Lawyers from San Francisco
Wesleyan University alumni
Stanford University trustees
19th-century American politicians
Speakers of the Wisconsin State Assembly
19th-century American judges
19th-century American lawyers